Meg Cranston (born 1960) is an American artist who works in sculpture and painting. She is also a writer.

Cranston was born in Baldwin, New York. She earned a B.A. in Anthropology/Sociology from Kenyon College in Ohio in 1982. She received an MFA in Studio Art from California Institute of the Arts in 1986. She also attended the Jan van Eyck Akademie in Maastricht, The Netherlands in 1988. She is currently the Chair of Fine Arts at Otis College of Art and Design in Los Angeles.

She has exhibited internationally since 1988.  In 1992 she was part of the Helter Skelter exhibition at MOCA, the Museum of Contemporary Art in Los Angeles, and showed at the 1993 Biennale di Venezia.

She is the recipient of numerous awards, including a New School of Social Research Faculty Development Grant, an artist grant from the Penny McCall Foundation, a Guggenheim Fellowship, a faculty research grant from the Center for Asian American Studies at UCLA, Architectural Foundation of America, an Artadia Award, an ab Art in Public Places Award, and a C.O.L.A. Individual Artist's Grant from Los Angeles Cultural Affairs.

Meg Cranston lives and works in California.

Work
Although she often takes personal attributes or historical events as a starting point, Cranston's work equally deals with the formal language of art and the role of the artist in helping us see the world in new ways.

Reviews
 ART IN REVIEW; Meg Cranston -- 'Magical Death'
 Meg Cranston in Frieze Magazine
 A scatter of slight gestures from Meg Cranston

Solo exhibitions 
2016
Meliksetian | Briggs, Los Angeles
2015
 Kunstverein Heilbronn, Berlin
2013
 Galerie Michael Janssen, Beriln
2012 - 2013
Hammer Museum, Los Angeles
2007
 Artspace, Auckland, New Zealand
 Kapinos Galerie, Berlin (with Peter Robinson)
2006
Venetia Kapernekas Gallery, New York
2005
 Museum for Contemporary Art, Siegen, Germany
 Galerie Michael Janssen, Cologne
 Happy Lion Gallery, Los Angeles
2003
 Leo Koenig Gallery, New York
2002 
Rosamund Felsen Gallery, Santa Monica
 Happy Lion Gallery, Los Angeles
2001 
 Goldman Tevis Gallery, Los Angeles
2000 
 Galerie Michael Kapinos, Berlin, Germany
 Venetia Kapernekas Fine Art, New York 1301PE, Los Angeles Printed Matter Inc., New York, New York
1999 
Rosamund Felsen Gallery, Santa Monica
1998 
 Kunstverein Leipzig, Projektgalerie Elsterpark
 Galerie Praz de La Vallade, Paris Dogenhaus Projekt, Berlin
 Witte de With Center for Contemporary Art, Rotterdam
1997 
 Callery & Boesky Gallery, New York
1996 
Rosamund Felsen Gallery, Santa Monica, California
1995 
 Galerie Etienne Ficheroulle, Brussels CBD Gallery, Sydney, Australia Galerie Tanja Grunert, Cologne
1994 
 Karsten Schubert Gallery Ltd., London Icebox, Athens, Greece 1301 Gallery, Santa Monica, California
1993 
 Carnegie Museum of Art, Pittsburgh (catalog)
 Galerie Tanja Grunert, Cologne, Germany Galerie Marc Joncou, Zurich Karsten Schubert Gallery Ltd., London
1992 
 1301, Santa Monica, California
1991 
 Ealan Wingate Gallery, New York Galerie Tanja Grunert, Cologne, Germany Olin Art Gallery, Kenyon College
1990 
 Koury/Wingate Gallery, New York Marc Richards Gallery, Los Angeles
1989 
 Marc Richards Gallery, Los Angeles
1988 
 Santa Monica Museum of Art, Santa Monica (catalogue), Jeffrey Linden Gallery, Los Angeles

References

External links
 Meg Cranston Gallery

American contemporary artists
1960 births
Living people
California Institute of the Arts alumni
Otis College of Art and Design faculty
American women artists
American women academics